Les Palaces is the thirteenth album by experimental French singer Brigitte Fontaine, released in 1997 on the Virgin Records label. The album was nominated at the Victoires de la musique for Artist of the Year, but lost to Zazie. The album features a collaboration with Alain Bashung, City, although Fontaine herself admits that the song is "a bit of a failure".

Track listing

References 

Brigitte Fontaine albums
1997 albums
Virgin Records albums